GC-rich sequence DNA-binding factor is a protein that in humans is encoded by the GCFC2 gene.

The first mRNA transcript isolated for this gene was part of an artificial chimera derived from two distinct gene transcripts and a primer used in the cloning process (see Genbank accession M29204). A positively charged amino terminus present only in the chimera was determined to bind GC-rich DNA, thus mistakenly thought to identify a transcription factor gene.

References

External links

Further reading